This is a list of radio stations that broadcast on FM frequency 88.6 MHz:

Australia
Plenty Valley FM, Melbourne

Austria
Radio 88.6, Vienna

China 
 CNR The Voice of China in Shigatse and Weinan

Indonesia
 Rhema 88.6 FM, Semarang
 RRI Batam Pro-3 in Batam and Singapore

Malaysia
 Hot FM in Kota Bharu, Kelantan

Netherlands
 SLAM!FM in Rotterdam, South Holland

New Zealand
Radio Active, Wellington

Pakistan
 Rasta FM 88.6, in Lahore

Tonga
Radio Nuku'alofa, Nuku'alofa

United Kingdom
 BBC Radio 2 in Borders, Bridgend, Great Glen, Hereford, Lancs, Milton Keynes, Penicuik 
 BBC Radio Sheffield in South Yorkshire

References

Lists of radio stations by frequency